Sílvia Marisa Garcia Rebelo (born 20 May 1989) is a Portuguese professional footballer who plays as a defender for Benfica and the Portugal women's national team.

Career

Club
Rebelo started to play football at early age. She started her career at the "Fundação Laura Santos" in 2009. Despite having more than 50 international caps for Portugal, Rebelo used to work in the Fundação Laura Santos' laundry while playing for their team in the Portuguese semi-professional league. She used to work eight hours a day as a laundry woman and train in the night. Rebelo also used to train with the C. D. Gouveia's men's team. On 31 July 2016 Rebelo moved to S.C. Braga. In 2016, the Portuguese Football Federation nominated Rebelo to the "Player of the Year" award. In June 2018, Rebelo moved to the newly formed S.L. Benfica team.

International
Rebelo played for Portugal at the 2007 UEFA Women's Under-19 Championship and the 2008 UEFA Women's Under-19 Championship Qualifying Stages. On 23 September 2009, in a qualification match against Italy, she debuted for Portugal Senior Team. On 31 March 2010, in a win against Armenia, Rebelo scored her first and only, to date, international goal. On 6 July 2017 Rebelo was called by coach Francisco Neto to represent Portugal at the UEFA Women's Euro 2017, the first time the Portuguese team reached the final stage of a big international tournament. She played every minute of the three matches Portugal played in tournament as her team was eliminated still in Group Stage. On 23 October 2020, Rebelo played her 100th match for Portugal in a 3–0 win over Cyprus in the UEFA Women's Euro 2021 qualifying.

International goals

Honours
Benfica
 Campeonato Nacional Feminino: 2020–21
 Campeonato Nacional II Divisão Feminino: 2018–19
 Taça de Portugal: 2018–19
 Taça da Liga: 2019–20, 2020–21
 Supertaça de Portugal: 2019

References

External links
 
 
 
 

1989 births
Living people
People from Gouveia, Portugal
Sílvia Rebelo
Sílvia Rebelo
Women's association football defenders
S.C. Braga (women's football) players
S.L. Benfica (women) footballers
Campeonato Nacional de Futebol Feminino players
FIFA Century Club
Sportspeople from Guarda District
UEFA Women's Euro 2022 players
UEFA Women's Euro 2017 players